"Master" Henry Gibson (August 9, 1942 – December 18, 2002) was an American percussionist, appearing on about 1200 albums, spanning a career of four decades.

Born in the United States, Gibson began playing on the streets of Chicago. While a young man, he performed for Operation Push with Rev. Jesse Jackson. Later, he became an integral member of Phil Cohran's  Artistic Heritage Ensemble. Gibson also played and recorded with the  jazz ensemble Odell Brown and the Organizers. He spent a lot of time in Chicago recording studios, which allowed him to be noticed and picked up by professional musicians who took him on tour. Eventually, he was playing and recording with well-known artists such as Donny Hathaway (Everything Is Everything) and Curtis Mayfield. Gibson chose to go on the road with Curtis Mayfield, leading to his success and recognition for his skill on the bongo and conga drums.

Henry Gibson performed in the Hawaiian Islands in the mid-70s and 80s and lived on the island of Oahu. He teamed with musician, songwriter, and producer Kirk Thompson to record the iconic Lemuria album and collaborated with many of the top local Waikiki musicians of that era, including vocalist, Azure McCall and pianist, Tennyson Stevens. He was an integral part of Kirk Thompson's 'Super Session' with Michael 'Papabax' Baxter on keyboards, John Gallarde on bass, and Ron Felix on drums. Gibson was a popular addition to the Waikiki music scene in those years.

While performing at a Hard Rock Cafe in Stockholm, Sweden, he met and later married his wife Anne. He died in Stockholm of a heart attack at age 60. His last concert appearance was with Khaled Habib and Zak Keith at the Lydmar Hotel in Stockholm.

His distinctive style can be heard among other recordings on Curtis Mayfield's "Pusherman." An unsung Soul artist, Gibson felt he had more than paid his dues. In his later years, he was less and less content with being a sideman and began asserting himself as the main attraction, placing his percussion at the forefront of shows. He was known for getting upset with audiences in noisy venues — after demanding their silence and full attention, he would instantly regain his focus and proceed to put on spellbinding performances on the bongos.

Months after his death in 2002, friends and musicians got together to organize a tribute concert at the Fasching jazz club in Stockholm. His music can still be heard daily on the radio, especially on recordings by Curtis Mayfield.

Film 
Henry appeared on several blaxploitation movies such as Super Fly.

Recordings 
 Sonny Stitt And Bennie Green (My Main Man 1964)
 Odell Brown & the Organ-izers (Ducky 1967: No More Water in the Well, Tough Tip, She's Coming My Way)
 Ahmad Jamal (Poinciana Revisited, live 1969: Poinciana; Ahmad 1975: Superstition)
 Donny Hathaway (Everything Is Everything 1970)
 Curtis Mayfield (Curtis Live!; Live at The Bitter End 1971)
 Kool & The Gang (Live At P.J.'S 1971: Dujii)
 The Rotary Connection (Hey Love, 1971: If I Sing My Song, Sea & She, I Am the Black Gold of the Sun)
 Eddie Harris (Instant Death, Atlantic 1971)
 Roy Ayers (The Boogie Back 1974)
 Leroy Hutson (Hutson 1975; Hutson II 1976: Love the Feeling, Situations, I Do, I Do, All Because of You, I Bless the Day, It's Different, Paradise, Closer to the Source 1978: Where Did Love Go?, Closer to the Source)
 Natalie Cole (Natalie 1976)
 Ben Sidran (Free in America 1976)
 Ebony Rhythm Funk Campaign (Watchin' You, Watchin' Me 1976: Giving Me Less Love, Understanding, Watchin' You)
 The Staple Singers (Pass It On 1976: Real Thing Inside of Me/Party, Take Your Own Time, Sweeter ...)
 Curtis Mayfield (Super Fly 1972; Short Eyes 1977; Live at Montreux 1987: Introduction, Ice 9 Instrumental, Back to the World; Live in Europe 1987: Introduction, Ice 9, Back to the World; Never Say You Can't Survive/Do It All Night 1999; Curtis Mayfield & Linda Clifford 2000: Rock You to Your Socks, Right Combination, I'm So Proud)
 Loleatta Holloway (Loleatta 1977: Hit And Run, Is It Just A Man's Way?, We're Getting Stronger)
 Lemuria Lemuria   Kirk Thompson : Honolulu, Hi.
 Aretha Franklin (Almighty Fire 1978: Almighty Fire (Woman of the Future), Lady, Lady, More Than... )
 Walter Jackson (Good to See You 1978)
 Minnie Riperton (Minnie 1979: Memory Lane, Lover and Friend, Return to Forever, All Of It, Lonely Girl, Happy New Love)
 Paulette McWilliams (Never Been Here Before 1979: Don't Let Love Go, I'll Never Make You Cry, Main Squeeze)
 Zak Keith (Sessions 1989: Shaw 'Nuff)
 Nohelani Cypriano (Around Again 1995: Livin' Without You, Moon Of Monakoora, South Sea Island Magic)
 Tyrone Davis (Best Of 1996: Let's Be Closer Together, In The Mood, Heart Failure, Close to You)
 Bob DeVos (Breaking the Ice 1999: Breaking The Ice, Walk On By, You Don't Know What Love Is)
 Gball da Godfather ("G"Street Remix 2000)
 Stanley B (All For Love 2002: This Is 'B', Do You?, All For Love)
 Charles Earland
 Phil Upchurch
 Kenny Burrell
 Earth Wind & Fire
 Red Rodney (Shaw 'Nuff)
 Gipsy Kings
 ...and about 1,170 more albums.

American soul musicians
American percussionists
1942 births
2002 deaths
Burials at Westwood Village Memorial Park Cemetery
American session musicians
Bongo players
Conga players
American expatriates in Sweden
20th-century American drummers
American male drummers
20th-century American male musicians
American emigrants to Sweden
R&B percussionists